Colico railway station is a railway station in Italy. Located on the Tirano–Lecco railway (with trains also to and from Milano Centrale) and the Colico-Chiavenna railway, it serves the town of Colico.

Construction 
The station building is a two-storey structure - of which the ground floor is usable by travellers - painted yellow. The structure of the building is very simple, with seven arches and a rectangular plan.

Next to the station building is another building, a smaller two-storey structure that houses the station's bar.

The service area has three main tracks and two truncated tracks, the latter being used for the Colico-Chiavenna line. All tracks are served by platforms at the standard European height of 55 centimetres.
There are fifteen tracks in total.

The station underwent upgrading works that involved the installation of a modern platform roof made of steel and glass, repainting of the station and the underpass and the installation of new loudspeakers inside the station (atrium and waiting hall); the works were begun in 2012 and finished in 2016.

Train Services 
Train services consist of regionale and RegioExpress trains, provided by Trenord according to the contract of service stipulated by the Lombardy Region.

There are about a hundred trains that serve this station and their principal destinations are Milano Centrale, Chiavenna, Sondrio, Tirano and Lecco.

In the final years of the 90's the "Train of the Snow" stopped here, which in the winter connected Napoli Centrale with Tirano.

Station Services 
  Ticketing Counter
  Spoken announcements for train arrivals and departures in Italian and English
  Waiting Hall
  Restrooms
  First Aid Post
  Bar

Interchanges 
  Bus -  Urbana (Colico-Frazioni-Colico) line
 Bus -  C10 (Colico-Menaggio-Como) line
 Bus -  A10 (Colico-Morbegno) line
Taxi

References

External links

Railway stations in Lombardy